Kléber was one of three  armored cruisers built for the French Navy in the first decade of the 20th century. Designed for overseas service and armed with eight  guns, the ships were smaller and less powerfully armed than their predecessors. Completed in 1904, Kléber was initially assigned to the Mediterranean Squadron before she was transferred to the Atlantic Division three years later, where she often served as a flagship. The ship was reduced to reserve in 1909–1910 before she was sent to the Far East in 1911. Kléber returned to France two years later and was again placed in reserve.

As tensions rose shortly before the beginning of World War I in August 1914, the ship was reactivated. When the war began she was assigned to defend Allied shipping in the English Channel and intercept German ships attempting to pass through. Transferred back to the Mediterranean in 1915, Kléber played a minor role on the periphery of the Gallipoli Campaign until a resurgence in German commerce raiding caused the Allies to transfer more cruisers to the Atlantic to protect their shipping in mid-1916. The ship was deemed surplus to requirements the following year; on her way back to France to decommission, Kléber struck a naval mine on 27 June and sank with the loss of 38 crewmen.

Design and description
The Dupleix-class ships were much smaller and more lightly armed than the preceding . The cruisers displaced  as designed. They normally had a crew of 19 officers and 550 enlisted men, but accommodated 24 officers and 583 enlisted men when serving as a flagship.

The sister ships' propulsion machinery consisted of three vertical triple-expansion steam engines, each driving a single propeller shaft, using steam provided by water-tube boilers, but the types of machinery differed between them. Kléber had three-cylinder engines that used 20 Niclausse boilers at a working pressure .

Armament and protection
The ships of the Dupleix class had a main armament that consisted of eight quick-firing (QF) Canon de 164.7 mm Modèle 1893–1896 guns. They were mounted in four twin gun turrets, one each fore and aft of the superstructure and a pair of wing turrets amidships. The cruisers' secondary armament consisted of four QF Canon de  Modèle de 1893 guns on single mounts in unprotected casemates in the hull. For defense against torpedo boats, they carried ten  and four  Hotchkiss guns, all of which were on single mounts. The ship were also equipped with two above-water  torpedo tubes, one on each broadside.

The face and sides of the gun turrets were protected by  Harvey face-hardened armor plates. The sides of the elliptical conning tower were 100 to 120 millimeters thick.

Service history

Named after the French Revolutionary-era General Jean-Baptiste Kléber, the ship was ordered from Forges et Chantiers de la Gironde on 28 December 1897. Construction was considerably delayed when the armament configuration was revised after the ship had already been laid down; the contract for Kléber was revised to account for the changes on 22 August 1899. Kléber was laid down at their shipyard in Bordeaux in early 1899 and launched on 20 September 1902. When the ship was launched she struck the river bottom because the height of the tide had been misjudged. Despite the damage, the ship began her formal sea trials on 26 September. Repairs and trials took two years and she was finally commissioned on 4 July 1904. The ship cost 19,258,000 francs.
Kléber was assigned to the Mediterranean Fleet's Light Squadron upon completion, together with her sister . The latter ship was transferred away in September 1905, but rejoined the squadron in November 1906, replacing Kléber which was transferred to the Atlantic where she became the flagship of the Antilles Division. During a visit to the United States, the ship accidentally rammed an American cargo ship, the  iron-hulled screw steamer Hugoma, on the Mississippi River off New Orleans, Louisiana, on 20 February 1907. There were 25 people on board the freighter, and sources disagree as to whether all of them survived or seven crewmen died. By 20 May Kléber was visiting New York City, together with the armored cruiser  and the protected cruiser . The trio sailed to Jamestown, Virginia, on 31 May where they participated in the Jamestown Exposition and in the naval review presided over by President Theodore Roosevelt on 10 June.

In January 1908 Kléber became flagship of the Moroccan Division and was placed in reserve the following year. In 1911 the ship was assigned to the Far East Naval Division, joining her sister . Kléber struck an uncharted reef on 12 July 1912 and received temporary repairs at Kobe, Japan, before returning to Lorient, France, in January 1913 where she returned to reserve.

World War I
As tensions rose during the July Crisis of 1914, Kléber, Desaix and the other cruisers in reserve were reactivated. The sisters were assigned to the 3rd Light Division ( (DL)) of the 2nd Light Squadron which was tasked to defend the English Channel in conjunction with the British. The 3rd DL was on station in the western end of the Channel by 4 August, where their mission was to intercept German shipping and provide distant cover for the smaller ships escorting the transports conveying the British Expeditionary Force to France. In early September, Kléber and the armored cruisers  and  established a new patrol line further south off the southern coast of Brittany.

Improved defenses in the Channel and the stabilization of the front in early 1915 allowed the cruisers to be released from their tasks, so Kléber was transferred to the Dardanelles to support Allied forces in the Gallipoli Campaign in May. She was assigned to the Dardanelles Squadron when that unit was formed on 16 May. The ship briefly ran aground off Scala Nuova Bay and was engaged by coastal artillery without effect before she could free herself. Kléber collided with the Royal Australian Navy troopship HMT Boorara in the Aegean Sea on 17 July 1915, forcing Boorara to beach herself on Mudros and damaging the cruiser's bow.

After the Kingdom of Bulgaria joined the Central Powers in mid-October, Kléber, the Russian protected cruiser  and four destroyers was tasked to raid the Aegean coast of Bulgaria between Dedeagatch and Porto Lago while other forces bombarded the former town and its nearby railroad junction on 21 October. The successes of merchant raiders like  in 1916 caused the Allies to transfer cruisers to the Atlantic to protect their shipping. Kléber became the flagship of a new 6th DL, which consisted of all three sisters, in July 1916, based in Dakar, French West Africa.

To release manpower for higher-priority patrol boats, the 6th DL was reduced to two ships and renamed the Coast of Africa Division on 18 May 1917;  (Rear Admiral) Louis Jaurès transferred his flag to Dupleix. En route to Brest, France, Kléber struck a mine at 06:00 on 27 June that the German U-boat  had laid off the Iroise entrance to Brest. The mine exploded abreast the forward boiler rooms, knocking them and the forward auxiliary machine room offline. The aft boilers were only operable for 20 more minutes before bulkheads began to give way at 06:30 and abandon ship was ordered. Nearby fishing trawlers, a French torpedo boat and a British steamship were able to rescue all but 38 of her crew.

References

Bibliography
 

 
 

Dupleix-class cruisers
Ships built in France
1902 ships
World War I cruisers of France
Maritime incidents in 1907
Maritime incidents in 1915
Maritime incidents in 1917
Ships sunk by mines
World War I shipwrecks in the Atlantic Ocean